Deshmukh (IAST:Dēśamukh),  is a historical title conferred to the rulers of a . It is used as a surname in certain regions of India, specifically in the states of Maharashtra, Karnataka, Telangana and Andhra Pradesh whose family received it as a title.

Etymology 
In Sanskrit, Deśa means land, country and mukha means head or chief; thus, deshmukh means "the head" of a district.

Deshmukh as a title

Local office 
Deshmukh was a historical title given to a person who was granted a territory of land, in Maharashtra, Karnataka, Telangana, Andhra Pradesh and Chhattisgarh. The granted territory was usually referred to as the Dēśamukhi. The Deshmukh was in effect the ruler of the territory, as he was entitled to a portion of the collected taxes. It was also his duty to maintain the basic services in the territory, such as police and judicial duties. It was typically a hereditary system. The title of Deshmukh provided the titled family with revenues from the area and the responsibilities to keep the orders.

The Deshmukh system was abolished after the independence of India in 1947, when the government confiscated most of the land of the Deshmukhs. Some families, however, maintain their status as real estate barons, most notably in Mumbai, with holdover properties that were not taken away.

It was similar in many respects to the Zamindar and Jagir systems in India, and can be considered as a feudal system. Typically taxes collected were to be distributed fairly, and occasionally Deshmukhs participated in Vedic rituals in which they redistributed all material possessions to the people. However, the title Deshmukh should not be associated to a particular religion or caste. Deshmukhis were granted by the Deccan sultanates, Mughal emperors, Nizams of Hyderabad and other Muslim rulers and by Maratha emperors (Chhatrapatis) to Deshastha Brahmins, Chandraseniya Kayastha Prabhus, Chitpavan Brahmins, Marathas, Lingayats, Reddys, Jains, Koli's and Muslims.

During the rule of Qutb-shahis of Golkonda majority of Deshmukhs and Sir-Deshmukhs were Deshastha Brahmins of Madhwa Section. But, later many of these Deshmukhs became Zamindars and Jagirdars during British rule.
In Andhra Pradesh, especially in the Guntur, Krishna, Nellore and Kurnool districts, the title "Deshmukh" was used by Deshastha Brahmin Zamindars.
In North Karnataka many parganas were granted to Deshastha Brahmins and were made Deshmukhs by Sultanate of Bijapur.
In Telangana many Jagirdars of Deshastha Brahmin, Velama and Reddy families were given the title "Deshmukh" by the Nizam of Hyderabad.

Inukonda Thirumali of Telangana describes the role of Deshmukhs:
They were primarily revenue collectors; and when (magisterial and judicial) responsibilities were added to their function they became Deshmukhs, chiefs of the parganas. Gradually, each of these assignments tended to become a watan i.e., hereditary lease. Despite changes in the political authority at the top, this institution survived, since no ruler from above wished to risk disturbing local administration, headed by village officials. This institution was deeply entrenched in the region with local support and structured in organized 'community' life. The Deshmukh presided over meetings of the pargana community known as ['got sabha'] which decided and confirmed claims over inheritance, purchase, and transfer of waters. The Deshmukh by virtue of local sanction and consensus could not be easily displaced from above.

Barry Pavier describes Deshmukhs:
These were, in the 1940s, the layer of the very large landowners in Telangana. The reforms abandoned the previous practice, of auctioning off the revenue collection in the government-administered areas to farmers, in favour of direct revenue collection by the State. The 'revenue farmers' were given land in compensation. Most of them availed of the opportunity to seize as much of the best land as they could. They also received a pension. The Deshmukhs were thus given a dominant position in the rural economy which they proceeded resolutely to strengthen during the succeeding decades.

Writing in the nineteenth century, Major W. H. Skyes, the statistical reporter to the Government of Bombay, described the Deshmukh:
The Desmukhs were, no doubt, originally appointed by Government, and they possessed all the above advantages, on the tenure of collecting and being responsible for the revenue, for superintending the cultivation and police of their districts, and carrying into effect all orders of Government. They were, in fact, to a district what a Patil is to a village; in short, were charged with its whole Government.

Notables 

Nanaji Deshmukh, social activist, founder of Bharatiya Jana Sangh Party, MP of BJP; Bharat Ratna.
Gopal Hari Deshmukh, writer and social reformer best known for his Lokhitwadinchi Shatapatre.
C.D. Deshmukh, economist, former governor of Reserve Bank of India and former Finance Minister in the Union Cabinet.
Durgabai Deshmukh, wife of C.D. Deshmukh and founder of Andhra Mahila Sabha.
Gopalrao Khedkar (Deshmukh). 1900- 1970 was the first President of the Maharashtra Pradesh Congress Committee. 
Ramrao Madhavrao Deshmukh (Marathi: रामराव माधवराव देश्मुख) (1892–1981) was a prominent political and academic personality from Amravati, Maharashtra. He was one of the very few Barristers from the region at that time.
Panjabrao Deshmukh, social and political leader, founder of Shivaji education Society, Amravati, the agricultural minister in Jawaharlal Nehru cabinet.
B.G.Deshmukh (1929–2011), former cabinet secretary and principal secretary to three prime (Rajiv Gandhi, VP Singh, and Chandrashekhar), a 1951 batch IAS and the first person to get into the IAS through competitive examinations.
B. N. Deshmukh, Politician and Justice of Bombay High Court
Sheshrao Deshmukh Parbhani
Vilasrao Deshmukh, former Chief Minister of Maharashtra.
Shivajirao Shankarrao Deshmukh, politician and Member of Parliament of Parbhani
Diliprao Deshmukh (born 1950), is an Indian politician and former minister in state Government of Maharashtra
Vijay Deshmukh, Maharashtra state Minister From solapur.
Amit Deshmukh (born 1976), is an Indian politician based in Latur and Minister in Government of Maharashtra
Ritesh Deshmukh, Hindi film actor; son of Vilasrao Deshmukh.
Shivajirao Deshmukh, former Chairman of Maharashtra Legislative Council 
Dhiraj Deshmukh (born 1980), an Indian politician from Marathwada region and member of Maharashtra Legislative Assembly
Anil Deshmukh, Home Minister of Maharashtra from NCP
Subhash Sureshchandra Deshmukh former Cabinet Minister of Maharashtra
Sandhya Shantaram (nee Vijaya Deshmukh), Actress
Ranjana Deshmukh, Marathi Actress
Sunil Deshmukh, politician and MLA.

References

Bibliography
 Dora and Gadi: Manifestation of Landlord Domination in Telangana, I. Thirumali, Economic and Political Weekly, Vol. 27, No. 9 (Feb. 29, 1992), pp. 477–482
 Telangana Movement Revisited, K. Balagopal, Economic and Political Weekly, Vol. 18, No. 18 (Apr. 30, 1983), pp. 709–712
 The Imperial Crisis in the Deccan, J. F. Richards, The Journal of Asian Studies, Vol. 35, No. 2 (Feb., 1976), pp. 237–256
 The Telangana Armed Struggle, Barry Pavier, Economic and Political Weekly, Vol. 9, No. 32/34, Special Number (Aug., 1974), pp. 1413+1417-1420 
 Anatomy of Rebellion, Claude Emerson Welch, SUNY Press, 1980 , 
 Report of Land Tenures of the Dekkan, by Major W. H. Skyes, Statistical Reporter to the Government of Bombay, Chapter VII pg9, Parliamentary Papers, Great Britain Parliament, House of Commons, HMSO 1866
 Indian Village, S. C. Dube, Morris Edward Opler, Routledge, 2003, pp. 45
 The Landed Gentry of the Telangana, Andhra Pradesh, Hugh Gray in Elites in South Asia, eds Edmund Leach and S.N. Mukherjee, Cambridge University Press, 1970
 Telangana People's Struggle and Its Lessons, P. Sundarayya, Foundation Books, 2006

Indian feudalism
Titles of national or ethnic leadership
Indian words and phrases
 Deshm
Marathi-language surnames
Koli titles
Indian surnames